Statistics of Emperor's Cup in the 1959 season.

Overview
It was contested by 16 teams, and Kwangaku Club won the championship.

Results

1st Round
All Rikkyo 1–0 Kwangaku Club
Yawata Steel 0–1 Nagoya Club
Toyama Soccer 0–13 Chuo University
Meiyu Club 3–2 Kyoto Shiko
All Tohoku Gakuin University 0–6 Furukawa Electric
Zen Hokkai Club 0–10 Kwangaku Club
All Osaka University of Economics 0–2 Toyo Industries
All Matsuyama Commercial High School 0–9 Keio BRB

Quarterfinals
All Rikkyo 3–4 Nagoya Club
Chuo University 4–1 Meiyu Club
Furukawa Electric 1–2 Kwangaku Club
Toyo Industries 1–0 Keio BRB

Semifinals
Nagoya Club 0–3 Chuo University
Kwangaku Club 2–0 Toyo Industries

Final
  
Chuo University 0–1 Kwangaku Club
Kwangaku Club won the championship.

References
 NHK

Emperor's Cup
1959 in Japanese football